Catalpa Creek is a stream in the U.S. state of Mississippi.

Catalpa Creek is a name derived from the Choctaw language purported to mean "dammed up or obstructed creek". Variant names are "Red Bull Creek" and "Tullapa Creek".

References

Rivers of Mississippi
Rivers of Clay County, Mississippi
Rivers of Lowndes County, Mississippi
Rivers of Oktibbeha County, Mississippi
Mississippi placenames of Native American origin